Vishwambari is a rāgam in Carnatic music (musical scale of South Indian classical music). It is the 54th melakarta rāgam in the 72 melakarta rāgam system of Carnatic music. It is called Vamshavati in Muthuswami Dikshitar school of Carnatic music.

Structure and Lakshana

It is the 6th rāgam in the 9th chakra Brahma. The mnemonic name is Brahma-Sha. The mnemonic phrase is sa ra gu mi pa dhu nu. Its  structure (ascending and descending scale) is as follows (see swaras in Carnatic music for details on below notation and terms):
: 
: 

Shuddha rishabham, antara gandharam, prati madhyamam, shatsruthi dhaivatham and kakali nishadham are the notes used in this scale, other than shadjam and panchamam. As Vishwambari is a melakarta, by definition it is a sampoorna rāgam (has all seven notes in ascending and descending scale). It is the prati madhyamam equivalent of Hatakambari, which is the 18th melakarta scale.

Janya rāgams 
Vishwambari has a few minor janya rāgams (derived scales) associated with it. See List of janya rāgams for full list of rāgams associated with Vishwambari.

Compositions 
A few compositions set to Vishwambari are:

Vamshavati shiva yuvati and Bhaktavatsalam by Muthuswami Dikshitar
Paramananda by Koteeswara Iyer
Vijayatam shri rajarajeswarim by Mysore Jayachamaraja Wodeyar

Related rāgams
This section covers the theoretical and scientific aspect of this rāgam.

Vishwambari's notes when shifted using Graha bhedam, yields 2 other minor melakarta rāgams, namely, Shamalangi and Ganamoorti. Graha bhedam is the step taken in keeping the relative note frequencies same, while shifting the shadjam to the next note in the rāgam. For further details and an illustration refer Graha bhedam on Ganamoorti.

Notes

References

Melakarta ragas